The Petrified Forest is a 1936 American film directed by Archie Mayo and based on Robert E. Sherwood's 1935 Broadway drama of the same name. The motion picture stars Leslie Howard, Bette Davis and Humphrey Bogart. The screenplay was written by Delmer Daves and Charles Kenyon, and adaptations were later performed on radio and television. The film is set in Petrified Forest National Park in Arizona. 

According to Variety, Warner Bros. filmed two endings. Howard's character dies in one and survives in the other.

In May 1945, Warner Bros. released another film based on Sherwood's play, Escape in the Desert. It pitches a Dutch flyer walking across country to San Francisco and others against a bunch of escaped Nazi POWs.

Plot

In the midst of the Great Depression, Alan Squier, a failed British writer, now a disillusioned, penniless drifter, wanders into a roadside diner in the remote town of Black Mesa, Arizona, at the edge of the Petrified Forest. The diner is run by Jason Maple, his daughter Gabrielle, and Gramp, Jason's father, who regales anyone who will listen with stories of his adventures in the Old West with such characters as Billy the Kid.

Gabrielle's mother, a French war bride who fell in love with Jason when he was a young, handsome American serviceman, left her "dull defeated man" after World War I and moved back to France when Gabrielle was a baby. She now sends poetry to Gabrielle, who dreams of moving to Bourges, where her parents first met, to become an artist. Alan tells his story—how he wrote one novel, then lived in France for eight years with his publisher's wife, trying to write another—and Gabrielle is instantly smitten with him.

Gabrielle shows Alan her paintings—the first time she has shown them to anyone—and reads him a favorite François Villon poem.  Boze Hertzlinger, a beefy diner employee who has wooed Gabrielle in vain, grows jealous of Alan, who decides to leave forthwith.  He mooches a ride from wealthy tourists Mr. and Mrs. Chisholm; but after only a few minutes on the road they encounter Duke Mantee, a notorious gangster fleeing a massive police pursuit, whose car has broken down.  Duke and his gang seize the Chisholms' car and drive to the diner, where Duke has arranged to rendezvous with his girlfriend, Doris, on their way to Mexico.  Alan, the Chisholms, and their chauffeur soon make their way back to the diner as well.

Alan, indifferent to the hostage situation, engages Duke in lively conversation and toasts him as "the last great apostle of rugged individualism."  Boze snatches a rifle and gets the drop on Duke, but during a momentary distraction Duke draws his pistol and shoots Boze in the hand, regaining control.  Duke learns that Doris has been captured, and has revealed their rendezvous location to the police.  As police and federal agents converge on the diner, Duke prepares to flee, announcing that he will take Mr. and Mrs. Chisholm with him.

Inspired by Boze's act of courage, Alan responds to an impulse: While Gabrielle is in the back room bandaging Boze's hand, he produces a life insurance policy from his bag and amends it, making Gabrielle the beneficiary. Then he asks Duke to kill him ("It couldn't make any difference to you, Duke ... they can hang you only once ..."), so that Gabrielle can use the insurance money to realize her dream of moving to France. Duke obliges, after Alan blocks him from leaving with his human shields; then Duke leaves, only to be caught by the police.  Alan dies in Gabrielle's arms, secure in the knowledge that she, unlike the rest, will escape her dead-end existence to pursue her dreams.

Cast

 Leslie Howard as Alan Squier
 Bette Davis as Gabrielle Maple
 Humphrey Bogart as Duke Mantee
 Genevieve Tobin as Mrs. Chisholm
 Dick Foran as Boze Hertzlinger
 Joseph Sawyer as Jackie
 Porter Hall as Jason Maple
 Charley Grapewin as Gramp Maple
 Paul Harvey as Mr. Chisholm
 Adrian Morris as Ruby
 Slim Thompson as Slim
 Eddie Acuff as First Lineman
 Francis J. Scheid as Second Lineman
 John Alexander as Joseph, the chauffeur
 Nina Campana as Paula, the cook
 Arthur Aylesworth as Commander (uncredited)
 Jim Farley as Sheriff (uncredited)
 Gus Leonard as Jim, the Mailman (uncredited)

History

The 1935 Broadway production of The Petrified Forest starred Howard, an established star, and Bogart, an actor in his first leading theatrical role. Sherwood based the Duke Mantee character on John Dillinger, the notorious criminal who in 1933 was named the FBI's first "Public Enemy #1" by J. Edgar Hoover, and in 1934 was ambushed and gunned down in spectacular fashion by FBI agents. Bogart, who won the stage role in part because of his physical resemblance to Dillinger, studied film footage of the gangster and mimicked some of his mannerisms in his portrayal.

For the film, Warner Brothers intended to cast the more bankable Edward G. Robinson as Duke; but Howard, whose contract gave him final script control, informed the studio that he would not appear in the movie version without Bogart as his co-star. The film made Bogart a star, and he remained grateful to Howard for the rest of his life. In 1952, Bogart and Lauren Bacall named their daughter Leslie Howard Bogart in honor of Howard, who had been killed in a plane crash when the German air force shot down his BOAC flight from Lisbon to Bristol during World War II.

In 1948, Robinson portrayed a character similar to Duke Mantee—a gangster holding a disparate group of people hostage in a Florida hotel—in Key Largo. That film's hero was played by Bogart. In his penultimate film, The Desperate Hours (1955), Bogart played another gangster holding a suburban family hostage. He described that character as "Duke Mantee grown up."

Radio and television adaptations

The Petrified Forest was performed in a one-hour radio adaptation on CBS's Lux Radio Theatre on November 22, 1937, with Herbert Marshall, Margaret Sullavan, and Donald Meek in the principal roles; and again on Lux Radio on April 23, 1945, with Ronald Colman, Susan Hayward, and Lawrence Tierney.

A half-hour radio adaptation starring Joan Bennett, Tyrone Power, and Bogart also aired on The Screen Guild Theater on January 7, 1940.

On September 20, 1953, the radio series Best Plays aired a one-hour adaptation, starring Cyril Ritchard.

In 1955, a live television version was performed in color as an installment of Producers' Showcase, a weekly dramatic anthology, featuring Bogart (now top-billed) as Mantee, Henry Fonda as Alan, and Lauren Bacall as Gabrielle. Jack Klugman, Richard Jaeckel, and Jack Warden played supporting roles. The television version differs in that it opens with Bogart and his men shown briefly in a getaway car driving through the desert and conversing for a moment, presumably to hook viewers immediately as they dial through the channels. In the late 1990s, Bacall donated the only known kinescope of the 1955 performance (albeit in black and white) to the Museum of Television & Radio (now the Paley Center for Media), where it remains archived for viewing in New York City and Los Angeles. It is now in the public domain.

Reception and legacy
Rotten Tomatoes rates the film 100% fresh based on 14 contemporary and modern reviews.

The film is recognized by the American Film Institute in the 2003 AFI's 100 Years...100 Heroes & Villains in which Duke Mantee appears as a Nominated Villain.

In January 1936, Variety wrote: “The picture sticks closely to the legit script... Playing the roles they created in the stage version are Leslie Howard and Humphrey Bogart – the former a soul-broken, disillusioned author, seeking, by wayfaring, to find some new significance in living, and the latter a killer, harried and surrounded by pursuers, revealing in his last moments a bewildered desperation which is not far removed from that of the writer. The scenes in which the desperado holds court, as he awaits his own doom, …are packed with skillfully etched drama and embroidered with appropriate touches of comedy. Impressively enacted is the romance between Howard and Bette Davis... Davis gives a characterization that fetches both sympathy and admiration. Bogart’s menace leaves nothing wanting."

Writing for The Spectator in 1936, Graham Greene gave the film a mildly poor review. Exploring the transition between Mayo's film and the original stage play from Sherwood, Greene found that Sherwood's lofty philosophy suffered from the adaptation and that the film's "drama slackens under the weight" of the playwright's themes which he characterized as "rather half-baked". Greene praises Davis and Howard for their performances but suggests that "life itself, which crept in during the opening scene [...] crept out again, leaving us only with the symbols."

Writing for Maclean's magazine at the time of the film's release, Ann Ross observed: “Very young people won't find The Petrified Forest much fun, but adults, who like wise and witty talk, with or without gunplay, should find it rewarding.”

Writing for Sur in September 1936, Jorge Luis Borges says the film was “one of the most intense that I have seen”. He praises the “extraordinarily distinct characters”, observing that “Once the allegorical motive is dismissed or relegated to a secondary level the plot of The Petrified Forest—the magical influence of approaching death on a random group of men and women—seems admirable to me. In this film, death works like hypnosis or alcohol: it brings the recesses of the soul into the light of day.”

After the film's release, Friz Freleng made the short-length Merrie Melodies cartoon parody, She Was an Acrobat's Daughter (1937), which portrays a cinema audience watching The Petrified Florist, starring Bette Savis and Lester Coward.

In 1972, a take-off of the film titled "The Putrified Forest" was a sketch on The Carol Burnett Show, featuring Steve Lawrence and Paul Sand.

The Warner Brothers sound stage on which the movie was filmed later became the home of Conan O'Brien's TBS television program.

The 2017 album The Petrified Forest by ambient musician Biosphere uses many clips of dialog from the film.

References

External links

 
 
 
 
 
 {{IMDb title | id=0394853 | title=Producers' Showcase: "The Petrified Forest"}}
 Producers' Showcase: "The Petrified Forest" at the Paley Center for Media
 Producers' Showcase: "The Petrified Forest" at the Internet Archive
 The Petrified Forest at Virtual History
Streaming audio
 The Petrified Forest on Lux Radio Theater: November 22, 1937
 The Petrified Forest on Screen Guild Theater: January 7, 1940
 The Petrified Forest on Lux Radio Theater: April 23, 1945
 The Petrified Forest at Best Plays'' September 20, 1953

1936 films
1936 crime drama films
American crime drama films
American black-and-white films
Film noir
American films based on plays
Films directed by Archie Mayo
Films produced by Hal B. Wallis
Films set in Mohave County, Arizona
Films set in restaurants
Films about hostage takings
Plays by Robert E. Sherwood
Warner Bros. films
1930s English-language films
1930s American films
Films scored by Bernhard Kaun
Great Depression films
Films about writers